Sabluiyeh (also Romanized as Sablū’īyeh, Sabaloo’eyeh, and Soblū’īyeh; also known as Bārkūh, Gonguk, and Sublu) is a village in Jorjafak Rural District, in the Central District of Zarand County, Kerman Province, Iran. At the 2006 census, its population was 66, in 27 families.

References 

Populated places in Zarand County